North Shore Air was a short-lived regional New Zealand scheduled airline that commenced daily flights between Auckland's North Shore and Tauranga in the Bay of Plenty, and Kerikeri in the Bay of Islands starting on 28 September 2015.  Scheduled flights ended on 30 October 2015. The airline's CEO stated that the airline may operate charter flights instead.

Fleet
North Shore Air's fleet consists of a single Piper Navajo.

See also
 List of defunct airlines of New Zealand
 History of aviation in New Zealand

References 

Defunct airlines of New Zealand